Dębowa (from Polish dębowy 'of oak trees') may refer to the following places:
Dębowa, Opole Voivodeship (south-west Poland)
Dębowa, Pomeranian Voivodeship (north Poland)
Dębowa, Subcarpathian Voivodeship (south-east Poland)